Pyramid Lake is a lake in the backcountry of the Desolation Wilderness in the Sierra Nevada of El Dorado County, California.

See also
List of lakes in California

References

Lakes of the Desolation Wilderness
Reservoirs in El Dorado County, California
Reservoirs in California
Reservoirs in Northern California